The following lists events that happened during 1924 in the British Mandate of Palestine.

Incumbents
 High Commissioner – Sir Herbert Louis Samuel
 Emir of Transjordan – Abdullah I bin al-Hussein
 Prime Minister of Transjordan – Hasan Khalid Abu al-Huda until 3 March; 'Ali Rida Basha al-Rikabi

Events

 24 April – The football team "Hapoel Haifa" is established, the first football team to belong to the "Hapoel" sport association.
 30 June Jacob Israël de Haan assassinated in Jerusalem by Haganah
 17 October – The HaNoar HaOved ("The Working Youth") movement is founded by Palestinian Jewish youth working to defend their rights. The name of the movement was changed in 1959 to "HaNoar HaOved VeHaLomed" ("The Working and Studying Youth").
 13 December – The founding of Herzliya, initially a semi-cooperative farming community (moshava), near the central Mediterranean coast of the country.

Unknown dates
 Collective Responsibility Ordenance issued giving powers of collective punishment in rural areas. Introduced to combat feuding between communities. The powers included application of fines and demolition of houses.
 The founding of the moshav Magdiel, one of the four original communities of Jewish agriculturalists that combined in 1964 to form Hod Hasharon.
 The founding of the agricultural settlement Bnei Brak by Rabbi Yitzchok Gerstenkorn and a group of Polish chasidim.

Births
 11 January – Yehuda Perah, Israeli politician (died 1998).
 24 January – Rabbi Hayim David HaLevi, Chief Rabbi of Tel Aviv (died 1998).
 20 February – Moshe Wertman, Israeli politician (died 2011)
 24 February – Ted Arison, Israeli-American businessman (died 1999).
 29 March – Amnon Linn, Israeli politician (died 2016).
 15 June – Ezer Weizman, Israeli Air Force commander and seventh President of Israel (died 2005).
 24 June – David Rubinger, Israeli photographer (died 2017)
 30 June - Amos Horev, Israeli general and President of the Technion – Israel Institute of Technology.
 31 July - Ben Zion Abba Shaul, Israeli Sephardic rabbi, Torah scholar, and Rosh Yeshiva (died 1998).
 31 July – Abraham Yakin, Israeli artist (died 2020)
 21 August – Pesah Grupper, Israeli politician (died 2013).
 13 September – Israel Tal, Israeli general (died 2010).
 15 September – Mordechai Tzipori, Israeli military officer and politician (died 2017).
 25 November – Zundel Kroizer, Israeli rabbi (2014).
 30 November – Pnina Bor, Israeli B'nai B'rith official, President of B'nai B'rith in Israel and Vice-President and Supervisor of the B'nai B'rith World Organization (died 2009).
 17 December – Yohai Ben-Nun, sixth commander of the Israeli Navy (died 1994).
 25 December – Yosef Avni, Irgun fighter
Full date unknown
 Siman-Tov Ganeh, Israeli war hero, recipient of the Hero of Israel medal (died 1968).
 Shmuel Ben-Dror, Israeli footballer (died 2009).
 Uzi Feinerman, Israeli politician (died 1975).
 Yehoshua Ben-Zion, Israeli banker (died 2004).
 Raquela Prywes, Israeli nurse (died 1985).

Notable deaths

References

 
Mandatory Palestine
Years in Mandatory Palestine
1920s in Mandatory Palestine
Mandatory Palestine